The Wyoming Cowgirls basketball team is a women's college basketball team at the University of Wyoming in Laramie, Wyoming.  Competing in the Mountain West Conference, the organization has a tradition dating back to 1973.

History 
The program began in 1973, with Bonnie Hulstrand as head coach. Following Hulstrand's leaving for the Idaho Vandals, Margie Hunt McDonald led the team for 9 seasons, finishing her coaching career with over 100 wins and a winning record at Wyoming. When McDonald left coaching to become the executive director of the High Country Athletic Conference, Dan Richards coached the team for three seasons. Chad Lavin was hired as head coach in 1986 and coached the Cowgirls for 12 seasons, including the 1989–90 season, in which the Cowgirls won their only conference regular season title. In 1998, Cheyenne, Wyoming native Cindy Fisher was hired as the head coach of the Cowgirls, and coached the team for five seasons, including the 2003 season, in which the Cowgirls appeared in the WNIT for the first time. In 2003, Fisher resigned her position, citing personal reasons.

On May 1, 2003, Wyoming announced the hiring of Utah assistant Joe Legerski as head coach. At the end of his first season, Legerski won the Mountain West Conference coach of the year award after leading a team with 7 freshman and 10 underclassman to a 5th place finish in the conference. In 2006, the Cowgirls achieved both the second 20–win season in the program's history and the program's second appearance in the WNIT. The next season, the team continued to improve, again winning over 20 games and making the WNIT tournament for 2007. The Cowgirls made it to the championship game and defeated Wisconsin 72–56 to win the tournament in front of a record crowd of 15,462 in the Arena-Auditorium. The 27 wins recorded by the 2006–07 team remain a program record. The Cowgirls continued to see improving results, finishing 24–7 and earning the program's first berth into the NCAA tournament, although the team lost in the first round to Pittsburgh. Over the next 11 seasons, the Cowgirls recorded 7 more 20–win seasons and 6 more appearances in the WNIT. At the conclusion of the 2018–19 season, Joe Legerski announced he was retiring as head coach after 16 years. Legerski won Mountain West conference coach of the year three times (2003–04, 2016–17, 2017–18) and retired as the program's winningest coach with a record of 314–186.

On May 7, 2019, longtime Cowgirl assistant Gerald Mattinson was named the seventh head coach in program history. In Mattinson's first season as the head coach, the Cowgirls went 17–12, and reached the semifinals of the Mountain West tournament. In Mattinson's second season, the Cowgirls went 14–10, but won the Mountain West tournament, the first in program history. The Cowgirls lost to UCLA in the Round of 64 of the NCAA tournament.

Coaching records

Postseason

NCAA tournament
The Cowgirls have appeared in the NCAA tournament two times. Their record is 0–2.

WNIT
The Cowgirls have appeared in the WNIT 11 times. Their combined record is 20–9. They won the tournament in 2007.

NWIT
The Cowgirls appeared in the NWIT 1 time. Their record is 0–3.

Team records

Career leaders

Single-season leaders

References

External links